Barrowford is a civil parish in Pendle, Lancashire, England.  It contains 34 listed buildings that are recorded in the National Heritage List for England.  Of these, two are at Grade II*, the middle grade, and the others are at Grade II, the lowest grade.  The parish contains the village of Barrowford and some surrounding countryside.  Originally an agricultural community, weaving came to the parish in the late 18th century. This was initially carried out in weavers' cottages, and later in mills.  The Leeds and Liverpool Canal arrived in the parish towards the end of the 18th century.

The listed buildings reflect the history of the parish.  They include farmhouses and farm buildings, some of which have been absorbed by the growing village, larger houses, and weavers' cottages.  Associated with the canal are locks, bridges, and an aqueduct.  The other listed buildings include a packhorse bridge, a road bridge, public houses, a toll house, a former mill and a chimney, a milestone, and a bandstand.

Key

Buildings

References

Citations

Sources

Lists of listed buildings in Lancashire
Buildings and structures in the Borough of Pendle